Milvexian is a factor XIa inhibitor which acts as an anticoagulant. It is taken by mouth. As of late 2021, it was under study for the prevention of blood clots in patients undergoing surgery.

References 

Anticoagulants
Chloroarenes
Triazoles
Pyrimidines
Difluoromethyl compounds
Carboxamides
Heterocyclic compounds with 3 rings
Nitrogen heterocycles